Fergal Moore (born 7 July 1982) is an Irish hurler who played as a right corner-back for the Galway senior team.

A brother of former Galway hurler Cathal, Moore made his first appearance for the team during the 2004 National League and became a regular member of the starting fifteen over a few seasons. Since then he has won one Leinster winners' medal and one National League winners' medal.

At club level Moore plays with Turloughmore.

Playing career

Club
Moore plays his club hurling with Turloughmore. He enjoyed some success in the juvenile and underage grades, however, success at senior level has eluded him.

Inter-county
Moore first came to prominence on the inter-county scene as a member of the Galway minor hurling team in the late nineties. It was a successful era for the county's minors, with Moore collecting an All-Ireland medal following a 0–13 to 0–10 defeat of Tipperary in 1999.

The following year Moore was still a key member of the Galway minors, and he collected a second All-Ireland medal following a 2–19 to 4–10 defeat of Cork.

By 2002 Moore had joined the Galway under-21 team and he lined out in yet another All-Ireland final. Limerick provided the opposition, however, in spite of being marginal favourites Galway were trounced by 3–17 to 0–8.

Moore was appointed captain of the Galway under-21 team in 2003 as he lined out in a second successive All-Ireland final in that grade. Kilkenny were the winners on that occasion by 2–13 to 0–12.

In 2004 Moore made his debut with the Galway senior hurling team. He won a National Hurling League medal that year after a 2–15 to 1–13 defeat of Waterford in the final. He made his championship debut later that year in an All-Ireland qualifier against Down. Since then he has been a regular with Galway, however, his career has been hampered through injury.

In 2012 Moore was appointed captain of the Galway senior hurling team. He later guided the team to their first Leinster title following a 2–21 to 2–11 trouncing of reigning All-Ireland champions and hot favourites Kilkenny. Both sides subsequently met in the All-Ireland decider and Galway nearly pulled off a victory courtesy of goals from Joe Canning and Niall Burke. A 2–13 to 0–19 draw was the result, a first drawn All-Ireland final in over half a century. Defeat to Kilkenny followed for Moore and his Galway team in the replay. Moore's outstanding performances in the 2012 Championship earned him his first All Star Award in October 2012.

Inter-provincial

Moore has also lined out with Connacht in the inter-provincial series of games. He won an Interprovincial Championship medal in 2004 following a 1–15 to 0–9 defeat of Munster.

References

 

1982 births
Living people
Hurling backs
Galway inter-county hurlers
Connacht inter-provincial hurlers
Turloughmore hurlers